Paulo José Gómez de Souza (20 March 1937 – 11 August 2021) was a Brazilian actor.

TV work
2014 - Em Família
2011 - Morde & Assopra
2009 - Caminho das Índias - Profeta Gentileza
2006 - JK
2004 - O Pequeno Alquimista
2004 - Senhora do Destino
2004 - Um Só Coração
2003 - Agora É que São Elas
2001 - Um Anjo Caiu do Céu
2000 - A Muralha
1999 - Luna Caliente
1998 - Labirinto
1998 - Era Uma Vez
1997 - Por Amor
1995 - Explode Coração
1995 - Decadência
1995 - Engraçadinha
1994 - A madona de cedro
1993 - Olho no Olho
1993 - O Mapa da Mina
1991 - Vamp
1990 - Araponga
1989 - Tieta
1989 - Sampa
1988 - Vida nova
1988 - Olho por Olho
1986 - Roda de fogo
1985 - Armação Ilimitada
1985 - O Tempo e o Vento
1976 - O casarão
1974 - Super Manoela
1972 - Shazan, Xerife & cia
1972 - O primeiro amor
1971 - O homem que deve morrer
1970 - Assim na terra como no céu
1969 - Véu de noiva

Selected filmography
2011 - Meu País
2011 - O Palhaço
2009 - A Festa Da Menina Morta
2006 - Saneamento Básico
2004 - Person
2004 - Benjamim
2004 - O Vestido
2003 - O Homem Que Copiava
2003 - Apolônio Brasil, O Campeão da Alegria
2002 - Poeta de Sete Faces
2002 - Dias de Nietzsche em Turim
1999 - Outras estórias
1998 - Policarpo Quaresma, herói do Brasil
1997 - Anahy de las Misiones
1991 - A Grande Arte
1989 - Dias Melhores Virão
1989 - Faca de Dois Gumes
1988 - O Mentiroso
1983 - A Difícil Viagem
1981 - O Homem do Pau-Brasil
1981 - Eles Não Usam Black-Tie
1975 - O Rei da Noite
1972 - Cassy Jones, o Magnífico Sedutor
1971 - A Culpa
1971 - Gaudêncio, o Centauro dos Pampas
1970 - Of Gods and the Undead
1969 - Macunaíma
1968 - As amorosas
1968 - O Homem Nu
1968 - Os Marginais
1968 - A vida provisória
1968 - Como vai, vai bem?
1967 - Bebel, garota-propaganda
1967 - Edu, coração de ouro
1966 - Todas as Mulheres do Mundo
1965 - The Priest and the Girl

References

External links

Profile of Paulo José (with correct spelling of surname: Gómez de Souza), memoriaglobo.globo.com; accessed 28 November 2014.

1937 births
2021 deaths
Brazilian male film actors
Brazilian male television actors
Brazilian male telenovela actors
People from Rio Grande do Sul
People with Parkinson's disease
20th-century Brazilian male actors
21st-century Brazilian male actors
Recipients of the Order of Cultural Merit (Brazil)